Shami Ghosh is an Indian-born historian who is Associate Professor at the Centre for Medieval Studies and Department of History at the University of Toronto. He researches Marxist history and the history of Germanic-speaking Europe.

Biography
Shami Ghosh was born in India. He received his BA (2003) in German at King's College London in 2003, and his MA (2005), PhD (2010) and LMS (2016) in Medieval Studies from the University of Toronto. Since 2016, Ghosh is Associate Professor at the Centre for Medieval Studies and Department of History at the University of Toronto.

Theories
The research of Ghosh centers on Marxist history and the history of Germanic-speaking Europe. He has published the monographs Kings' Sagas and Norwegian History (2011) and Writing The Barbarian Past (2015). In the latter monograph, Ghosh argues that the only thing early Germanic peoples had in common was speaking Germanic languages, but that these linguistic similarities are insignificant. He denies that early Germanic peoples shared a common culture or identity, and believes that they only shared cultural similarities because mutual intelligibility facilitated cultural exchanges between them. Ghosh advocates replacing the term "Germanic" with the term "barbarian".

Selected works
 Kings’ Sagas and Norwegian History, 2011
 Writing the Barbarian Past: Studies in Early Medieval Historical Narrative, Brill’s Series on the Early Middle Ages, 24 (Leiden: Brill, 2016)

References

Sources

External links
 Andrew Gillett at Academia.edu

Alumni of King's College London
Historians of socialism
21st-century Indian historians
Living people
Year of birth missing (living people)
University of Toronto alumni
Academic staff of the University of Toronto